Amadeus Webersinke (1920–2005) was a German pianist and organist.

Webersinke studied from at the Institut für Kirchenmusik in Leipzig with Karl Straube, Johann Nepomuk David, and Otto Weinreich. He was a lecturer  at the Felix Mendelssohn College of Music and Theatre. Until 1953, he worked mainly as an organist, and later only as a pianist.

Webersinke was particularly devoted to Bach's organ and piano works and also gave concerts on the clavichord. He recorded Max Reger's Piano Concerto. 1966, he assumed a professorship at the Hochschule für Musik Carl Maria von Weber Dresden.

External links 
 knerger.de – his grave
 Bach-cantatas.com – Amadeus Webersinke

1920 births
2005 deaths
German classical pianists
Male classical pianists
German classical organists
German male organists
Academic staff of the Hochschule für Musik Carl Maria von Weber
University of Music and Theatre Leipzig alumni
Recipients of the Order of Merit of the Free State of Saxony
German Bohemian people
German people of German Bohemian descent
People from Broumov
Naturalized citizens of Germany
Czechoslovak emigrants to Germany
20th-century classical pianists
20th-century German musicians
20th-century organists
20th-century German male musicians
Male classical organists